Odd Squad (stylized as ODD SQUAD) is a children's live action educational television series that premiered on TVOKids in Canada and PBS Kids in the United States on November 26, 2014. Similar to Cyberchase and Peg + Cat, other math-centered programs aired on PBS Kids, the series involves child characters using mathematical concepts (addition, multiplication, using data in graphs, etc.) to advance each episode's plot. The series was created by Tim McKeon and Adam Peltzman and is co-produced by Sinking Ship Entertainment and Fred Rogers Productions in association with TVOKids and Ici Radio-Canada Télé. The series features child actors (whose characters are the employees of the "Odd Squad") who use indirect reasoning and basic math to solve and investigate strange happenings in their town. The series is a general satire of the police procedural and spy fiction genres and uses humour to teach the audience basic math skills and math-related topics. In the UK, the series airs on CBBC and BBC Two. In Australia, it airs on ABC Kids and ABC Me.

Description
The series follows the exploits of Odd Squad, an organization run entirely by children, that solves peculiar problems using math skills. In the first two seasons, it typically features two employees of the organization's investigation division that work in precinct 13579 of the organization—Agents Olive (Dalila Bela) and Otto (Filip Geljo) in the first season and Olympia (Anna Cathcart) and Otis (Isaac Kragten) in the second season. Selected episodes feature other types of employees of the fictional organization, like security officers, so-called "tube operators" and scientists. The names of the employees nearly always start with the letter O. Agents are typically assigned cases by their boss, Ms. O (Millie Davis), and travel via a system of interconnected tubes to get to their destinations. They deduce the solution to the problem or how to detain the perpetrator by using basic mathematical principles that are typically the focus of the episode. Often, they cannot solve the problem at the scene and must go back to their precinct's headquarters or to the "Mathroom", a sentient space that communicates through large paper fortune tellers and can unfold them to display information to help the agents see connections and better solve their case. Along with math, agents also use "gadgets" designed by the scientists; in the first season, Agent Oscar (Sean Michael Kyer) heads the lab, gaining an assistant, Agent Oona (Olivia Presti), in early season two who eventually takes over the lab after Oscar is promoted. The characters also have to deal with a variety of recurring villains who often put a mathematical spin on their plots. The seal of the Odd Squad headquarters depicts a jackalope carrying a shield in front of it (bearing an image of the seal—an instance of the Droste effect) and bananas at each side of it. The third season, dubbed Odd Squad Mobile Unit, sees a setting change from precinct 13579 to a van; in this season, four agents are assigned by the Big O (Davis) to work in the van and travel the world solving cases where local precincts either can't reach or need extra help.

Cast and characters

Main

 Agent Olive (Dalila Bela, season 1): Referred to as a longtime employee of the Odd Squad, Olive began season one of the series adapting to working with and training her new partner, Otto. Olive is usually calm, brisk and serious. She has a morbid fear of pies, which she acquired after saving her organization's building from a pie-related disaster caused by her former partner, Todd. In the season one finale, Olive departs the series along with her partner, Otto, to run a different Odd Squad precinct as Ms. O.
 Agent Otto (Filip Geljo, season 1): Olive's partner and, in the first episode, the newest employee of the organization. In contrast to his partner's more serious demeanor and personality, he is a more lenient, laid-back employee. Despite his lack of experience with his job, Otto frequently uncovers the facts needed to solve the case at hand, even doing so in the absence of his more experienced partner. In the season finale, Otto departs the series to run another Odd Squad office as Mr. O with Olive as his partner.
 Big O (Millie Davis, seasons 1-3): Known as "Ms. O" (the title of any female head of an Odd Squad division) in the first two seasons, she is a very strict boss. She tends to yell (a habit seen less frequently as the series progresses) and is often seen sipping a juice box. Despite appearing younger than most of the agents, Ms. O's tenure at the precinct and her actual age remain a mystery. In-show, it is revealed that her actual name is "Oprah." In the season two finale, Ms. O is promoted to the rank of Big O, the leader of the entire Odd Squad organization. She leaves the show after the Season 3 episode "Odd Off The Press" due to traveling to outer space, appointing Little O to replace her. 
 Agent Oscar (Sean Michael Kyer, seasons 1-2): Oscar was the precinct's head scientist, in charge of the laboratory. Other employees go to him for technical solutions to their problems. Oscar is depicted as being very intelligent and having a quirky and goofy personality. He left the show after the Season 2 episode "Oscar Strikes Back," where he became the president of the organization's science division after the former president was dismissed for misconduct, which appoints Agent Oona to take over for him.
 Agent Olympia (Anna Cathcart, season 2): Introduced in the first episode of season two, Olympia joins the series to fill in the opening left by the departure of Olive in the season one finale. She was given early graduation from the organization's training academy. She is depicted as being very social and outgoing and having a generally happy and carefree personality.
 Agent Otis (Isaac Kragten, season 2): Like Olympia, Otis was introduced at the start of season two, brought in to fill the opening left by the departure of Otto in the season one finale. Unlike his partner, he has a more serious and socially reserved personality. There are no records of him attending the organization's academy, but he is depicted as being the more seasoned member of the new team. He has a fear of ducks, revealed in the season two finale to be related to the fact he was once part of a family of villainous ducks. Ms. O took pity on Otis and trained him herself to become an Odd Squad agent.
 Agent Oona (Olivia Presti, season 2; special guest season 3): Initially Oscar's assistant, she takes up his position after his departure. Like Oscar, she is depicted as having a quirky personality.
 Agent Opal (Valentina Herrera, season 3): Originally stationed at a precinct in the Arctic with Omar, she is competitive with a strong desire to be working on cases important to combating oddness, viewing herself as the leader of OSMU. Opal's sister, Olizabeth, is The Shadow. She departed from the series after the Season 3 episode "End of the Road" because she's staying with Olizabeth to fix the damage done in Australia. 
 Agent Omar (Jayce Alexander, season 3): Originally stationed in the Arctic with Opal, he is known to value friendship and connection with his fellow agents, often attempting to mediate or calm the waters among his team, though his tendency to do so can sometimes distract him from the mission at hand.
 Agent Oswald (Gavin Maclver-Wright, season 3): Before being assigned to the Odd Squad Mobile Unit, Oswald worked as the only employee of the Odd Squad museum in New York City. Having spent the entirety of his career behind a desk, he is often excited to jump into tasks or cases.
 Agent Orla (Alyssa Hidalgo, season 3): Orla joins the Odd Squad Mobile Unit after having spent 400 years in isolation at an ancient Odd Squad headquarters protecting the powerful 44-leaf clover. Because of her separation from society at large and her history standing guard, she is often unfamiliar with modern inventions and has a tendency to react to situations quickly and without forethought.
 Agent Osmeralda (Glee Dango, season 3): Appearing as Esmeralda Kim in early season 3, she often showed up desiring to help but stating she was too busy with various hobbies such as karate or music instrument practice. In "Odd Off the Press," having finally cleared up her schedule, she is brought into fill the opening left by the departure of Opal. She brings her out-of-the-box thinking skills to the team.
 Little O (Shazdeh Kapadia, season 3): Formerly Big O's assistant, she takes a position as a substitute for Big O as the head of Odd Squad at the end of "Odd Off the Press." She may be small, but she likes the job.

Recurring

Odd Squad employees

 Dr. O (Peyton Kennedy, seasons 1-2; Kaden Stephen, season 2): The precinct's resident medical employee who assists others with medical-related problems. She is known for her eccentric behavior and frequently says things that make no sense; often her dialogue references popular science-fiction series like Star Trek or Doctor Who. It is revealed in-show that she was once a worker in the Odd Squad gift shop, but became a doctor when the gift shop was shut down. After the original Dr. O leaves to work as a doctor in space, she is replaced with a new male doctor who previously worked in another department.
 Agent Obfusco (Jaeden J. Noel, season 1): An Odd Squad agent and cross-cultural expert who speaks in obscure riddles, a characteristic intended to teach viewers how to understand word problems. He is eccentric and difficult for the other agents to understand, which leads them to try to avoid working with him.
 Agent Ocean (Elijah Sandiford, season 2): The precinct's director of the 'Creature Room,' which houses many bizarre creatures and plants which Odd Squad agents may need to know about. Ocean has a laid-back and easy-going personality.
 Agent Octavia (Julia Lalonde, season 1): Agent Oz's partner. It was noted in an episode that she is one of the precinct's best employees. She is usually looking for her partner because he is invisible.
 Agent O'Donahue (Tate Yap, season 1-2): Ms. O's partner after Olga went to the odd side. He was Ms. O's partner up until the 1980s when he and Oprah (Ms. O) failed to solve a case featuring a mysterious villain Equal Evan. He then quit, but returned 30 years later to help his partner finally solve the case. Now he pretends to be retired while secretly solving cases undercover for Ms. O.
 Oksana (Madeleine Barbeau, seasons 1-2): The precinct's sole resident cook. She has a deadpan and sarcastic personality.
 Agent Olaf (Eshaan Buadwal, seasons 1-2): Agent Oren's partner. Olaf is happy-go-lucky but tends to be simple-minded. Despite this, he has displayed moments of intelligence, often to the shock and amazement of his fellow agents. He shares Oren's penchant for laziness. He dreams of becoming a dentist. He has an unusual obsession with potatoes. Later on in the series, it is revealed that he is a werewolf.
 Agent Orchid (Michela Luci, seasons 1-3): One of the younger agents. She tends to be extremely stubborn and is often sarcastic and difficult as well as cunning and manipulative. She enjoys calling others "Sherman."
 Agent Oren (Brendan Heard, seasons 1-2): Agent Olaf's partner. Oren is depicted as snarky and arrogant. Oren and his partner have an ongoing rivalry with Olive and Otto. Oren has an unusual fear of pancakes and dreams of becoming an Odd Squad director and running his own precinct.
 Other Olympia (Saara Chaudry, seasons 1-2): Ms. O's old assistant. After defeating a villain, she became an agent alongside her partner Ozric. Her name used to be Olympia until she and Agent Olympia (Anna Cathcart) had a "name off" in the episode Other Olympia. Her name was later changed to Odal.
 Agent Owen (Christian Distefano, seasons 1-2): The head of the precinct's Security department, in charge of defending against intruders and other vital protective measures of the surrounding town, the squad and its employees. He is frequently seen going on break.
 Agent Orson (Nashton Avila, Nathan Avila, seasons 1-3): One of the baby agents, he is an excellent driver and was frequent winner of the precinct's employee of the month award until he was found to have rigged the results. In the season two finale, Agent Orson is promoted to Mr. O after the former Ms. O is promoted to the rank of Big O.
 Agent Ozlyn (Arista Arhin, season 2): Worker in the Security Department.
 Agent Ozric (Drew Haytaoglu, seasons 1-2): Ozric used to be an assistant who worked for Ms. O at Odd Squad. After defeating a villain, he became an agent alongside her partner Olympia (Saara Chaudry).
 Agent Olly (Sasha Steiner, season 2): A former doctor who now assists Oksana with maintaining the building's break room and cafeteria.
 Agent Xavier (Leonidas Castrounis, season 2) from Odd Squad's Department X Special Task Force who oversee the agency's work, enforce rules (similar to Internal Affairs) and have the power to temporarily shut Odd Squad down.
 Agent Xena (Sheena Darnley, season 2) Agent Xavier's partner.

Others
 Delivery Debbie (Ashley Botting): A pizzeria owner who has appeared in numerous episodes and played a key part in the series movie, Odd Squad: The Movie (2016). Her archrival is Delivery Doug who specializes in the sale of egg-salad sandwiches.
 Polly Graph (Ava Preston): A girl who runs a stand selling hot chocolate or lemonade, depending on the season, outside her house. Employees of the local 'Odd Squad' precinct frequently patronize her stand. She is very fond of graphs and has just the right visual representation to deal with the situation at hand. While she is not an agent, she offers data to employees who visit her stand. On occasion, she assists with cases and internal business within the organization.
 Soundcheck (Lucas Meeuse, Matthew Armet, Thomas Alderson, Stephan Dickson): A fictitious and satirical boy band made up of Tony D., Danny T., Ringo, and Johnny J., and is well liked by most all the precinct employees. Songs by the group include Take Away Four, The Force of Gravity and Up, Down, Left, Right. Sound Check as a group appears on the album Odd Squad: Stop the Music.
 Rivka (Meghan Allen): The caretaker for the unseen Baby Genius.  Agents meet with them in a dark alley, and have to give gifts that amuse Baby Genius, to get their help.

Villains
 Agent Ohlm (Jaiden Cannatelli, seasons 1-2): A slow-witted agent who briefly served as a partner for Agent Otto, later on partnering with Agent Orchid when Otto and Olive depart the precinct. Ohlm is best known for his unpredictability, causing confusion and getting lost. In the season two finale, it's revealed that Ohlm is in reality a clever, intelligent, calculating individual, but played at being dumb in order to destroy Odd Squad out of spite for not immediately being the Big O.
Fladam (Martin Roach, seasons 1-2): A villain with glasses capable of transforming anything into a two-dimensional form.
 Noisemaker (David Tompa, seasons 1-3): A villain who wants to fill the world with odd noises. He wears a variety of instruments all over his body that make sounds whenever he moves.
 Odd Todd (Joshua Kilimnik, seasons 1-2): Previously Olive's partner, Todd was fired for misconduct and began to pursue villainy, taking the name of 'Odd Todd'. A recurring villain in the first season, he was outsmarted by Agent Otto and renounced villainy for other interests. In the second season, he takes up gardening and has been seen providing assistance to the precinct's employees; he briefly returns as a villain in an alternate timeline in "World Turned Odd." In the season two finale, he is running a center to help other villains reform. Early in the first season before Todd was introduced, a running gag was that the number 43, his badge number, was hidden in various places for viewers to find.
 Puppetmaster (Stacey McGunnigle, season 1): A villainess who not only turns people into Muppet-based puppets, but also plays with sock puppets she presumably makes. She has long hair styled in an updo.
 Shapeshifter (Laura Landauer, seasons 1-2): A villain who can transform anything or anyone, including herself, into a different object or person. A younger version of Shapeshifter is seen in the movie produced to accompany the series. In Season 3, she has a twin sister named The Form Changer.
 Tiny Dancer (Danielle Benton, seasons 1-2): A villain that makes inanimate objects dance on command.
 Freeze Ray Ray (Farid Yazdani, Season 2): A villain who can freeze anything or anyone, including himself, using his left hand encased in his case.
 Jamie Jam (Ashley Comeau, seasons 2-3): A villain who likes jam up the city. She likes to stress the difference between jams and jellies.
 Kooky Clown (seasons 1-2): A villain who wants to destroy Odd Squad so that the world would be more kooky.
 Jelly Bean Joe (Dustin Redshaw, season 1)
 The Shadow (Zarina Richard, season 3): A villain named who causes oddness for the Odd Squad Mobile Unit. Her real name is revealed to be Olizabeth in "Follow the Leader." She is Agent Opal's sister.
 Brutus (Osias Reid, season 3): The Shadow's assistant.

Episode list

Production
Odd Squad films the series throughout Ontario. Part of season 3 was filmed in Cambridge, Ontario.

Awards and nominations

References

External links
 
 PBS Kids Home Page
 Odd Squad on TVO Kids
 Organisation Super Insolite on Ici Radio-Canada Télé

PBS original programming
TVO original programming
2010s American children's television series
2020s American children's television series
2014 American television series debuts
2022 American television series endings
2010s Canadian children's television series
2020s Canadian children's television series
2014 Canadian television series debuts
2022 Canadian television series endings
American children's education television series
Canadian children's education television series
English-language television shows
Mathematics education television series
Television shows filmed in Toronto
PBS Kids shows
Canadian television shows featuring puppetry
American television shows featuring puppetry
Fictional secret agents and spies